Greg Banaszak (born June 23, 1966) is an American saxophonist specializing in classical music and jazz. He has performed in both styles through concerto performances, solo, and chamber music recitals and jazz festivals in the United States, Eastern and Western Europe, the Middle East, and Asia.

Career
Banaszak received bachelor's degree from the Hartt School of Music, a master's degree from the Fryderyk Chopin University of Music in Warsaw, and an Artist Diploma from the Centre Musical d’Annecy in France.

Banaszak is a faculty member of the Cleveland Institute of Music, Case Western Reserve University, and Lutheran High School West. In 2001, he was appointed to the National Academy of Recording Arts and Sciences as a voting member for the annual Grammy Awards.

Recording primarily for Centaur since 1999, he has also produced albums for Chanson, Hyperion and Open Loop.

Discography
 The Glazunov Concerto, Katowice State Symphony Orchestra (Chanson, 1991)
 Double Vision with Christopher Casey (Open Loop, 1995)
 Saxophone Concertos, Polish National Chamber Orchestra (Centaur, 1999)
 Romances for Saxophone and Orchestra, Beethoven Academy Orchestra of Krakow (Centaur, 2008)
 Bird w/Strings Revisited, Gorzow Philharmonic Orchestra (Polonia Jazz, 2011)
 Concertos for Saxophone and Orchestra (Centaur, 2011)
 Duo Concertos for Alto Saxophone, Flute and Orchestra, Podlaise Symphony Orchestra (Centaur, 2011)
 Neo-Ragtime: The Music of Brian Dykstra (Centaur, 2012)

References

External links
Greg Banaszak official site

Classical saxophonists
American jazz saxophonists
American male saxophonists
Living people
University of Hartford Hartt School alumni
Cleveland Institute of Music faculty
Place of birth missing (living people)
1966 births
Baldwin Wallace University faculty
21st-century American saxophonists
21st-century American male musicians
American male jazz musicians
Centaur Records artists